Mike DeCarlo (born March 14, 1957) is an American comics artist. He is best known for his work for DC Comics in the 1980s inking the artwork of such artists as George Pérez, Greg LaRocque, Keith Giffen, and Jim Aparo.

DeCarlo has worked on various titles including Atari Force, Cartoon Network Block Party, Crisis on Infinite Earths, Fantastic Four, and Simpsons Comics as well as adaptations of the Warner Bros. stable of cartoons including Looney Tunes, Animaniacs, Pinky and the Brain and Superman & Bugs Bunny.

Comics
Mike DeCarlo entered the comics industry as an assistant to Dick Giordano. When Giordano became an editor at DC Comics in 1980, DeCarlo became an inker in his own right. DeCarlo inked the penciled artwork of George Pérez on "The Judas Contract" storyarc in Tales of the Teen Titans with Giordano. Pérez critiqued their work in a 2003 interview stating that "While not perfect in getting the same feel [as Pérez inking the art himself], they were closer as far as the crispness that the characters needed." He inked the Legion of Super-Heroes from 1986 to 1988 first with Greg LaRocque and then briefly with Keith Giffen. As inker of the Batman comic book series, DeCarlo worked on several key storylines including the "Ten Nights of The Beast" which introduced the KGBeast; "A Death in the Family" which featured the death of the second Robin Jason Todd; and "A Lonely Place of Dying" which saw Tim Drake become the third Robin. In 2014, critic Greg Burgas of Comic Book Resources reviewed DeCarlo's inking of Jim Aparo's work on the final chapter of "Ten Nights of The Beast" commenting that "inkers who don’t add roughness to Aparo’s line work aren’t doing him any favors. DeCarlo is better than [Bill] Wray, but he still seems to keep Aparo’s work too smooth." He later adds that "I love the first image, with Batman and the Beast fighting in the sewer and the artists somehow putting their shadows on the wall. I don’t know if Aparo drew this in and then DeCarlo inked it, or if DeCarlo just inked it without the benefit of pencils. It’s quite cool, though."

At Marvel Comics, DeCarlo inked Conan the Barbarian, NFL SuperPro, The Mighty Thor, and What The--?!

Bongo Comics Group's Radioactive Man series received an Eisner Award in 2002 for "Best Humor Publication" while DeCarlo was one of the artists.

Role-playing games
DeCarlo illustrated the covers to the DC Heroes role-playing game adventures Deadly Fusion (1990) and The Law of Darkness (1990). Other products in the game line that he drew include the Who's Who in the DC Universe Role-Playing Supplement 1 (1992) and the DC Heroes Role-Playing Game (3rd Edition, 1993).

References

External links

Mike DeCarlo at Mike's Amazing World of Comics
Mike DeCarlo at the Unofficial Handbook of Marvel Comics Creators

1957 births
20th-century American artists
21st-century American artists
American comics artists
Comics inkers
DC Comics people
Living people
Marvel Comics people
Place of birth missing (living people)
Role-playing game artists